was a Japanese female warrior of the Aizu Domain, who fought and died during the Boshin War. During the Battle of Aizu, she fought with a naginata (a Japanese polearm) and was the leader of an ad hoc corps of female combatants who fought in the battle independently.

Takeko and other women stepped forward on the front line without permission, as the senior Aizu retainers did not allow them to fight as an official part of the domain's army.

History

Early years 
Born in Edo, Nakano Takeko was the firstborn daughter of Nakano Heinai (1810-1878), an official of Aizu, and of Nakano Kōko (1825-1872), daughter of Oinuma Kinai, samurai in the service of Toda of the Ashikaga domain. She had a younger brother and sister: Nakano Toyoki and Nakano Yūko (1853-1931). Their residence was in Beidai Ninocho, in the quarters of Tamogami Hyogo, a distant relative of her father. She was good-looking, well-educated, and came from a powerful samurai family.

From 1853 to 1863, she received a strict and complete training in martial arts, in the literary arts on Chinese Confucian classics and in calligraphy, and was adopted by her own teacher, Akaoka Daisuke, who was also the famous instructor of Matsudaira Teru, adoptive younger sister of Matsudaira Katamori, daimyō of Aizu. She taught students younger than her, like her sister, who also attended school. She loved to read the many stories of Japanese female warriors, generals and empresses, but the legend of Tomoe Gozen deeply affected her. From childhood, she recited the Ogura Hyakunin isshu.

Nakano's certification (menkyo) was in Hasso-Shoken, a branch of the major Itto-ryu tradition. With this official acknowledgment of her ability, she found employment at the Itakura estate, lord of Niwase, a secondary domain in today's Okayama prefecture. She taught naginata to the lord's wife and served her as her secretary. She left this position in 1863, when she was adopted by her master, who had been transferred to Osaka for a job of the Aizu domain and had forces deployed in Kyoto for security duties. He tried to get her to marry his nephew, but since the nation was shaken by social unrest, she refused and reunited with her Edo family.

After working with the adoptive father as instructor of martial arts during the sixties of the nineteenth century, Nakano was in the region of Aizu for the first time in February 1868. During those spring and summer months, she taught naginata to women and children in Aizuwakamatsu castle, as well as capturing the voyeurs of the women's bathroom.

The civil war 
Nakano's martial figure is linked to the time of the Boshin War, which saw two factions opposed in a civil conflict: the loyal supporters of the Tokugawa shogunate against the advocates for the restoration of the Meiji emperor.

During the conflict, Nakano Takeko worked in defense of the shōgun Tokugawa Yoshinobu and took part in the Battle of Aizu, in which she distinguished herself by fighting against a white weapon, brandishing a naginata. In the clash with the overwhelming imperial forces, together with her mother and sister, she was head of an ad hoc body of female warriors.

The  was formed by these women: 

 The leader of the group, Nakano Takeko. She was 21 years old at this time.
 Takeko's mother and sister, Kouko and Yūko. At this time Kouko was in her 40s and Yūko was 16 years old.
 Hirata Kochō and younger sister Hirata Yoshi.
 Yoda Kikuko and the mother or older sister Yoda Mariko.
 The famous female warrior, Yamamoto Yaeko.
 Okamura Sakiko and older sister Okamura Makiko.
 A unnamed woman who was Watashi's concubine.
Jinbo Yukiko, a female retainer of the Aizu clan.
 The students of Monna naginata dojo: Monna Rieko, Saigo Tomiko and Nagai Sadako.
 The younger sister of Hara Gorō.
 Kawahara Asako and Koike Chiyoku.

Through rain and sleet, the women went into battle. They fought autonomously and independently, since the ancient officials of Aizu, in particular Kayano Gonbei, did not allow them to fight, officially, as part of the army of domination. This unit was later retroactively given the name of a female army (娘子 隊 Jōshitai?). It was Furuya Sakuzaemon, a Shogunate Army colonel commanding elements of the 11th and 12th Infantry Regiments, who designated her as the leader of the warrior women the day before her death.

Death 
Early in the morning, at the Yanagi bridge in the area of Nishibata, Fukushima, Nakano launched a charge against the troops of the Japanese Imperial Army of the Domain of Ōgaki, commanded by a Shaguma and armed with firearms. When the Imperial troops realized, in shock, that their enemies were female warriors, their commanders ordered the troops not to kill them. This hesitation gave Nakano's warriors an opening to attack. They killed several Imperial troops before the gunfire finally resumed. The lethal fury of the women of Aizu impressed their enemy, who were not expecting such resistance. Armed with her naginata, Nakano Takeko herself killed five or six soldiers before succumbing to a rifle shot to the chest.

Rather than letting the enemy take possession of her corpse to wreak havoc and cut off her head as a war trophy, Nakano asked her sister Yūko to behead her in order to prevent her capture, as well as give her an honourable burial. Yūko agreed to her sister's request. She asked for the assistance of Ueno Yoshisaburō, an Aizu soldier, to help with the beheading. Hirata Kochō, the foster younger sister who had studied naginata and calligraphy as Daisuke's foster daughter, was saved by Jinbo Yukiko in the battle and, being the vice-commander, assumed command of the troop to defend Aizuwakamatsu Castle after she was killed, while the deputy became Yamamoto Yaeko. Later, Kōko and Yūko entered Tsuruga castle and joined Yamamoto Yae.

After the battle, detached from the body, the head of Nakano Takeko was thus moved by her sister to the nearby Hōkai temple of her family, modern Aizubange, in the prefecture of Fukushima, and buried with honour by the priest under a pine tree. Her weapon was donated to the temple.

Monument

A monument to her was erected beside her grave at Hōkai Temple. Aizu native and Imperial Japanese Navy admiral Dewa Shigetō was involved in its construction.

Legacy
During the annual Aizu Autumn Festival, a group of young girls wearing hakama and white headbands take part in the procession, commemorating the actions of Nakano and her band of women fighters of the Joshigun.

References

Further reading
 
  (incl. "The Wshigun")

External links

 Samurai Warrior Queens TRAILER. Urban Canyons. YouTube.

Japanese women in warfare
1847 births
1868 deaths
People of the Boshin War
People from Tokyo
Deaths by firearm in Japan
Women in 19th-century warfare
Japanese military personnel killed in action